Hideaki Kawamura (born 15 September 1974 in Miyagi Prefecture) is a Japanese former 400 metres hurdler who competed in the 1996 Summer Olympics and in the 2000 Summer Olympics.

His personal best in the event is 48.84 seconds, set in 2000.

Competition record

References

1974 births
Living people
Sportspeople from Miyagi Prefecture
Japanese male hurdlers
Olympic male hurdlers
Olympic athletes of Japan
Athletes (track and field) at the 1996 Summer Olympics
Athletes (track and field) at the 2000 Summer Olympics
Asian Games gold medalists for Japan
Asian Games medalists in athletics (track and field)
Athletes (track and field) at the 1998 Asian Games
Medalists at the 1998 Asian Games
World Athletics Championships athletes for Japan
Japan Championships in Athletics winners
20th-century Japanese people
21st-century Japanese people